Direct care is the care of an identified patient by an identified clinical professional, used throughout the National Health Service in the United Kingdom.

Definition 
The Second Caldicott Report, chaired by Dame Fiona Caldicott, defined direct care as:

There is no consensus on whether the definition should include measures of person satisfaction including measurement of outcomes undertaken by one or more registered and regulated health or social care professionals and their team with whom the individual has a legitimate relationship for their care. Such considerations may come under individual audit mechanisms, however healthcare systems may seek wider access for the purposes of their bureaucracy.

Direct Care is contrasted with Secondary Uses, which are all other uses of medical records, usually as bulk personal datasets, some of which have been the source of international controversy. Examples of secondary uses include health care analytics, risk stratification, medical research, and pharmaceutical marketing. Uses of health care records without patient consent are controversial.

Direct care in nursing 
In nursing, direct care of a patient is provided personally by a staff member. Direct patient care may involve any aspects of the health care of a patient, including treatments, counselling, self-care, patient education and administration of medication.

Limitations of audit 
In the second report for the Department of Health, Fiona Caldicott wrote that:

See also 
 Shared care
 Caldicott Report
 Fiona Caldicott

References

External links 
 

National Health Service